Milas–Bodrum Airport  is an international airport that serves the Turkish towns of Bodrum and Milas. The airport is situated 36 km northeast of the town of Bodrum, and 16 km south of Milas.

Terminals
A spacious new international terminal was completed in 2000; this then became the domestic terminal in 2012 following the completion of the new international terminal. The old terminal, now reserved for domestic flights, is next to the international terminal. The terminals host about 2.5 million travellers per year, and are especially busy during the peak summer tourism months when charter flights arrive frequently from major cities in Europe.

The new terminal, designed to handle 5 million passengers a year, opened in June 2012 and operation of the airport was transferred to a private company who run the airport on behalf of the Turkish Government. The terminal itself is now large and spacious with additional seating and two outdoor smoking areas which can be accessed, from the departures lounge. Improvements were made to the check in area and the former international terminal was converted into a domestic terminal.

Airlines and destinations

Traffic statistics

See also 
 Dalaman Airport, the other international airport in Muğla
 List of airports in Turkey

References

External links
Bodrum Airport at the site of Turkey's General Directorate Of State Airports Authority

Airports in Turkey
Buildings and structures in Muğla Province
Transport in Muğla Province
Milas District
Bodrum District